George Fochive (born March 24, 1992) is an American soccer player.

Career

College and amateur
Of Cameroonian descent, Fochive spent ten years of his early life in France where he played boarding school soccer at Lycée Godefroy de Bouillon in Clermont-Ferrand. He started his college soccer career at Hawaii Pacific University in 2010, where he spent two years before transferring to UConn in 2012.

While at college, Fochive also appeared for USL PDL club Real Maryland Monarchs in 2011 and 2012.

Professional
Fochive was drafted in the third round of the 2014 MLS SuperDraft (39th overall) by the Portland Timbers, and was signed by the club in February 2014.

Fochive was loaned to Portland's USL Pro affiliate club Sacramento Republic and made his debut on April 27, 2014, in a 1-2 defeat to Harrisburg City Islanders.

In February 2016, Portland sold Fochive to Viborg FF of the Danish Superliga.

Fochive departed Viborg in December 2018.

On January 12, 2019, Fochive signed in the Israeli Premier League club Hapoel Hadera.

On July 16, 2020, Fochive signed in Hapoel Kfar Saba.

On June 8, 2021, Fochive signs for a second time with the Portland Timbers through 2022.  Following the 2022 season, his contract option was declined by Portland.

Honors
Portland Timbers
 MLS Cup: 2015
 Western Conference (playoffs): 2015

References

External links

 
 
 

1992 births
Living people
American soccer players
UConn Huskies men's soccer players
Real Maryland F.C. players
Portland Timbers players
Sacramento Republic FC players
Portland Timbers 2 players
Viborg FF players
Hapoel Hadera F.C. players
Hapoel Kfar Saba F.C. players
Bnei Yehuda Tel Aviv F.C. players
Association football midfielders
Portland Timbers draft picks
USL League Two players
USL Championship players
Major League Soccer players
Israeli Premier League players
Expatriate men's footballers in Denmark
Expatriate footballers in Israel
American expatriate sportspeople in Denmark
American expatriate sportspeople in Israel
Soccer players from Washington, D.C.
Hawaii Pacific Sharks men's soccer players
American expatriate soccer players
MLS Next Pro players